Attia may refer to:

Attia (gens), a plebeian family at Rome

Given name 
Attia Al Nashwy (born 1988), Egyptian footballer 
Attia El-Sayed Aly (born 1954), Egyptian volleyball player
Attia Hamouda (1914–1992), Egyptian weightlifter
Attia Hosain (1913–1998), Indian feminist, writer and broadcaster
Attia Nasreddin, businessman of Eritrean origin, CEO and Chairman of the Nasco Group in Nigeria

Surname 
Caroline Attia (born 1960), French alpine skier
Dove Attia (born 1957), French musical producer and television personality
Hassan El-Sayed Attia (born 1931), Egyptian sport shooter
Kader Attia (born 1970), French artist
Mahmoud Attia (born 1981), Egyptian Paralympic powerlifter
Mohamed Ben Attia (born 1976), Tunisian director and screenwriter
Peter Attia (born 1973), American physician 
Raafat Attia (born 1934), Egyptian footballer

See also 
Ouled Attia, town and commune in Skikda Province in northeastern Algeria
Attia v British Gas plc, 1988 English tort law case, establishing that nervous shock from witnessing the destruction of personal property may be actionable
Attias
Atias
Atia (disambiguation)
Attea
Atiyah

Feminine given names